The Mei-hwa Spinning Top Museum is a museum about spinning tops in Daxi District, Taoyuan City, Taiwan.

History
The museum began to operate in 2007.

Architecture
The museum is located at the Meihua Elementary School.

See also
 List of museums in Taiwan

References

External links
 YouTube - The elephant top team from Mei Hua elementary school(Taiwan, OCAC, macroview)

2007 establishments in Taiwan
Children's museums in Taiwan
Museums established in 2007
Museums in Taoyuan City
School museums
Toy museums in Taiwan
Tops